Alfredo Kulembe Ribeiro (born 27 March 1990), known as Fredy, is an Angolan professional footballer who plays for Turkish club Antalyaspor as a forward. 

He achieved totals of 108 games and 11 goals in Portugal's Primeira Liga with Belenenses and B-SAD, while winning the Segunda Liga with the former in 2013. He also played for one season in the Dutch Eredivisie with Excelsior Rotterdam and for several years at Antalyaspor in Turkey.

Fredy, who also holds Portuguese citizenship and represented the country at youth level, made his senior debut for Angola in 2014. He was part of their squad at the 2019 Africa Cup of Nations.

Club career

Born in Luanda, Fredy joined C.F. Os Belenenses' youth system at the age of 11, signing from neighbouring G.D.P. Costa de Caparica. He made his Primeira Liga debut on 3 April 2009, coming on as a 60th-minute substitute in a 1–0 away loss to Académica de Coimbra. He finished his first full season with 24 scoreless appearances, as the Lisbon team were relegated.

Fredy scored eight goals in 38 games in the 2012–13 campaign, helping the club to return to the top tier as champions after three years. He scored for the first time in the competition on 12 April 2014, his brace helping the team come from behind to win 3–1 at home against Vitória de Guimarães.

In January 2015, Fredy returned to Angola and signed with C.R.D. Libolo, initially on loan. On 20 July 2016 he agreed to a one-year contract at SBV Excelsior in the Dutch Eredivisie, rejoining his former Belenenses manager Mitchell van der Gaag. He missed just two games in his only season and scored twice in a 12th-place finish, including in a 3–2 home win over rivals Sparta Rotterdam on 19 November.

Fredy returned to Belenenses in June 2017, signing a two-year deal. He scored six league goals and provided six assists in the first part of 2018–19 for the newly organised B-SAD, including two goals in a 3–2 win at C.D. Santa Clara on 30 November.

On 31 January 2019, Fredy moved to Turkish club Antalyaspor. He was a national cup runner-up in 2020–21 Turkish Cup, scoring in a 2–0 home win over Pendikspor in the fourth round, and a penalty for the only goal in the quarter-final at Sivasspor on 11 February.

International career
Fredy won 34 caps for Portugal at youth level, including ten for the under-21 side. He scored twice for them, in friendlies against Denmark (1–1) and Macedonia (a 2–1 win).

Fredy received his first callup to the Angola national team in February 2014. He made his debut on 5 March, in a friendly 1–1 draw away to Mozambique; his first goal was on 3 August and was the sole strike of a home win against Ethiopia in another exhibition.

On 26 March 2016, Fredy scored his first competitive goal for the Palancas Negras from the penalty spot at the end of a 2–1 loss away to the DR Congo, who eventually qualified for the following year's Africa Cup of Nations. He was selected for the 2019 edition in Egypt, starting all three games in a group stage exit.

Career statistics

International

 (Angola score listed first, score column indicates score after each Fredy goal)

References

External links

1990 births
Living people
Portuguese sportspeople of Angolan descent
Footballers from Luanda
Portuguese footballers
Angolan footballers
Association football forwards
Primeira Liga players
Liga Portugal 2 players
C.F. Os Belenenses players
Belenenses SAD players
Girabola players
C.R.D. Libolo players
Eredivisie players
Excelsior Rotterdam players
Süper Lig players
Antalyaspor footballers
Portugal youth international footballers
Portugal under-21 international footballers
Angola international footballers
2019 Africa Cup of Nations players
Angolan expatriate footballers
Expatriate footballers in Portugal
Expatriate footballers in the Netherlands
Expatriate footballers in Turkey
Angolan expatriate sportspeople in Portugal
Angolan expatriate sportspeople in the Netherlands